Battle of Toropets may refer to:

 Battle of Toropets (1580)
 Battle of Toropets (1609)